Kothwan, also spelled Kothawan, is a village and corresponding community development block in Hardoi district of Uttar Pradesh, India. Located 8 km from the city of Beniganj, Kothwan hosts a Parikrma fair during the month of Phalguna where people gather for worship purposes. Vendors bring various items of merchandise to sell at the fair, including carpets, handloom cloth, glassware, earthen pots, toys, and sweets. Kothwan also hosts a market on Wednesdays and Sundays, which involves the sale of miscellaneous products. The main staple foods in Kothwan are wheat and rice. As of 2011, the population of Kothwan is 5,323, in 1,063 households.

Demographic history 
The 1961 census recorded an average attendance of about 500 people at the biweekly market in Kothwan. Average attendance of the Parikrma fair was listed as 9,000 people at the time.

The 1981 census recorded Kothwan as having a population of 2,570, in 523 households, and covering an area of 582.36 hectares.

Villages 
Kothwan CD block has the following 86 villages:

References 

Villages in Hardoi district